Iowa Speedway is a 7/8-mile (1.4 km) paved oval motor racing track in Newton, Iowa, United States, approximately  east of Des Moines. It has over 25,000 permanent seats as well as a unique multi-tiered RV viewing area along the backstretch. The premiere event of the track is the Hy-Vee IndyCar Race Weekend held yearly in July since its inaugural running in 2007.

History

The track opened in September 2006 with the Soy Biodiesel 250, won by Woody Howard, for the USAR Hooters Pro Cup Four Champions playoff. The Indy Racing League announced a race there on June 24, 2007, the Iowa Corn Indy 250, which was won by Dario Franchitti, who barely nipped Marco Andretti at the finish line. The track also secured a combined NASCAR Camping World East-West race where results counted towards both series' championships. That race delivered a dramatic battle between 17-year-old Joey Logano from the Busch East Series, who defeated Daytona 500 champion Kevin Harvick, 1998 West Series champion, who represented the West Series at the end of the race. The track was awarded a NASCAR Camping World Truck Series race and a NASCAR Xfinity Series race in 2009.

On July 5, 2011, it was announced that the Manatt family, builders and primary owners of the Iowa Speedway, through the holding company U.S. Motorsports Corporation, had sold their majority interest to the Clement family, owners of Featherlite Incorporated. "It was our privilege to help build the track five years ago, and like a proud parent, we've enjoyed watching it thrive and grow," said company president Brad Manatt. Featherlite Incorporated already has a long-standing relationship with NASCAR. Many race teams use Featherlite Trailers and Featherlite Coaches for the transport of cars and staff. Rusty Wallace will remain a minority owner in the track.

Following news of financial issues at the track, the facility was purchased by NASCAR by November 2013.

The track has periodically been rumored as a candidate for a NASCAR Cup Series race; in 2013, a bill to allow $8 million in upgrades to the speedway toward that goal began circulating in the Iowa Legislature.

In April 2020, the NASCAR-sanctioned races at Iowa for the 2020 Xfinity and Truck seasons were canceled due to the COVID-19 pandemic. Only the ARCA Menards Series and IndyCar races were held in July, with an extremely reduced number of spectators. After the races, it was reported that the track is for sale following the 2020 season. Iowa Speedway did not host an IndyCar, NASCAR Xfinity Series or NASCAR Camping World Truck Series race in their 2021 seasons, but did host the ARCA Menards Series. IndyCar announced in August 2021 that they would be returning in 2022.

Other events
The facility also hosts a few driving schools, such as the Rusty Wallace Racing Experience and The Formula Experience, where visitors have the opportunity to experience the speedway from behind the wheel of a race car.

In August 2022, the facility will host the annual Pyrotechnics Guild International convention, a weeklong event featuring fireworks displays, educational seminars, pyrotechnic manufacturing, and other activities related to the pyrotechnic arts.

Track length and layout

The track was designed with influence from Rusty Wallace and patterned after Richmond Raceway as a D-shaped oval, a short track where Wallace was very successful.

The track length is disputed by the two major series that run at Iowa.

Races

Current
 IndyCar Series  
 Hy-Vee Salute to Farmers 300 presented by Google (July)
 Hy-VeeDeals.com 250 presented by DoorDash (July)
 Indy Lights (July)
 ARCA Racing Series – Calypso Lemonade 150 (June)

Former
 NASCAR Xfinity Series
 CircuitCity.com 250 (June)
 U.S. Cellular 250 (July)
 NASCAR Gander RV & Outdoors Truck Series – 
 M&M's 200 (June)
 Fan Appreciation 200 (September)
 NASCAR Whelen Modified Tour (July)
 Grand Am Rolex Sports Car Series
 USAC Silver Crown
 USAC AMSOIL National Sprint Car Championship
 USAC NOS Energy National Midget Championship 
 NASCAR K&N Pro Series East and West (July)
 USAR Pro Cup
 Indy Pro 2000 Championship
 U.S. F2000 National Championship

Notes

References

 Speedway website
 Map and circuit history at RacingCircuits.info
 
 Trackpedia guide to driving this track

ARCA Menards Series tracks
IndyCar Series tracks
Buildings and structures in Jasper County, Iowa
Motorsport venues in Iowa
NASCAR tracks
Tourist attractions in Jasper County, Iowa
NASCAR races at Iowa Speedway
2006 establishments in Iowa
Newton, Iowa